Downtown Kollam is the primary central business district in the city of Kollam, Kerala, India. Located entirely within the former municipality of old Quilon, it is approximately bounded by Chinnakada to the east, Thangassery to the West, Cutchery to the north, and Mundakkal to the South. The area is popularly known for its business activities. Kollam was formerly an international emporium of trade and today remains a prosperous commercial centre.

The downtown area of Kollam has a long business history. Marco Polo, the Venetian traveller, who was in Chinese service under Kubla Khan in 1275, visited Kollam and other towns on the west coast, in his capacity as a Chinese mandarin. He pointed out that Old Kollam was the only town on the west coast of India with multi-story buildings, some of which still stand today. He found Christians and Jews living in Coilum (Kollam) as well as merchants from China and Arabia. Polo left a detailed account of Kollam in his writings, extracts of which are reproduced in the Travancore State Manual. Many clothing, vegetables, stationary, pharmaceuticals, and spice wholesale-retail dealers do business in the downtown area of this old industrial city and there are many hotels in the downtown area. The proximity to Kollam Port makes this area one of the biggest business centres in India. It also contains the buildings of the Kollam Municipal Corporation.

Big Bazaar and Pharma City
Nowadays Downtown Kollam is one of the largest central business districts in the state of Kerala. The area is noted for its rich trade history and culture. Kollam's main road runs through the center of this downtown business district of Old Quilon. The north-south area of this downtown is popularly known as Big bazaar. As the name indicates, it is the biggest bazaar in city of Kollam. There are many rice, spice and cloth merchants doing business in the Big bazaar area.

The area behind Kollam District hospital is known as Pharma city because of its large number of pharmaceutical  and surgical distributors. The place is also a favorite destination of doctors and physicians in the city. There are also many electronics and laptop service centres.

Business centres

 Valiyakada
 Lakshminada
 Chamakada
 Chinnakada
 Pullikada
 Paikkada
 Kadappakada
 Kottamukku
 Kochupilamoodu
 Vadakkumbhagam
 Pallithottam
 Kollam Beach
 Vadayattukotta
 Thamarakulam
 Andamukkam
 Vaddy
 Kaval
 Thangassery
 Port Kollam

Notable shopping centres
 Bishop Jerome Nagar

References

External links

Neighbourhoods in Kollam
Economy of Kollam
Retail markets in Kollam
Tourist attractions in Kollam